Weinzierlein (colloquially: "Wáindserla") is a village in the town of Zirndorf in the Central Franconian district of Fürth in Bavaria, Germany.

Geography 
Together with Wintersdorf to the east, Weinzierlein forms a contiguous settlement and lies on the southern banks of the Bibert and on the stream of the Roßtaler Mühlbach, which empties into the Bibert from the right in the village. To the southwest it is bounded by the woods of Erlach, to the northwest on the far side of the Bibert is the forest of Streitlach, with the hill of Weinberg. To the south rises the Mäusbuck.

Population growth 
Gemeinde Weinzierlein

Ort Weinzierlein

Religion 
Since the Reformation the village has been predominantly Protestant. Those who are Evangelical-Lutheran are part of the parish of St. Laurence (Roßtal); Roman-Catholics are part of the church of Christ the King (Roßtal).

Culture 
Weinzierlein is the location of one of the fictitious "Schafkopf Academies", known by locals in the Nuremberg region as the "card playing school" ("Kartelschule"), see also Schafkopf language.

The carnival of Kärwa takes place annually on the first weekend in August in Weinzierlein.

References

Literature 
 Festschrift „75 Jahre Stadt Zirndorf“, 1987.
 Johann Kaspar Bundschuh: Weinzirlein. In: Geographisches Statistisch-Topographisches Lexikon von Franken. Band 6: V–Z. Verlag der Stettinischen Buchhandlung, Ulm 1804, DNB 790364328, OCLC 833753116, Sp. 133 (Digitalisat).
 August Gebeßler: Stadt und Landkreis Fürth (= Bayerische Kunstdenkmale. Band 18). Deutscher Kunstverlag, München 1963, DNB 451450957, S. 170–171.
 Hanns Hubert Hofmann: Nürnberg-Fürth (= Historischer Atlas von Bayern, Teil Franken. I, 4). Kommission für Bayerische Landesgeschichte, München 1954, DNB 452071224, S. 187 (Digitalisat).Ebd. S. 234–235 (Digitalisat).
 Wolfgang Wiessner: Stadt und Landkreis Fürth (= Historisches Ortsnamenbuch von Bayern, Mittelfranken. Band 1). Kommission für Bayerische Landesgeschichte, München 1963, DNB 455524629, S. 101–102.

External links 

 

Fürth (district)
Villages in Bavaria